Anthony Henday (fl. 1750–1762) was one of the first Europeans to explore the interior of what would eventually become western Canada. He ventured farther westward than any white man had before him. 
As an employee of the Hudson's Bay Company he travelled across the prairies in the 1750s, journeying into what is now central Alberta, possibly arriving at the present site of Red Deer.
His purpose was to encourage First Nations in the upper watershed of the Saskatchewan River to come to Hudson Bay to trade, but due to the great distance involved, their inability to build canoes and paddle them, and  fear of attack by Cree along the river, Blackfoot and other western prairie First Nations were reluctant to make the journey.

Early life 
Henday was from the Isle of Wight, England. He may have been baptised in Shorwell on 24 December 1725.

Hudson's Bay Company
A convicted smuggler, Henday joined the Hudson's Bay Company (HBC) in 1750 as a net-maker and labourer. Being described by company officials as being "bold and enterprising".

From the 1600s to the late 1800s the HBC had the exclusive fur trade for the land within Hudson Bay's watershed. This region was known as Rupert's Land. For the furs that HBC desired they wanted to trade commodities such as tobacco, kettles, axes, mirrors, beads, and alcohol.

The HBC was concerned that La Vérendrye and other French entrepreneurs were funnelling the fur trade from Rupert's Land away from the English at Hudson Bay. Eventually, James Isham, chief factor at York Fort, suggested an expedition to western Rupert's Land to encourage First Nations to trade at Hudson Bay. The HBC authorized and funded Henday to lead explorations into the interior of Rupert's Land, using York Factory as his base.

On June 26, 1754, he set out with several Cree companions on foot to travel from York Factory into the interior westward, today's Alberta. His route is not clear it is variously thought he travelled to present-day Red Deer, or Balermo or Innisfail  or Stettler  or Eckville or the Calgary area all or only some of those places.

It is documented Henday's group passed the French Fort Paskoya "Pasqua"/"Basquia" or "Paskoway Yay," today's The Pas, on July 15, 1754, as recorded in his journal. There he may have met La Corne, the western commander.

In 1754 he and his group came to what is now Alberta with a mission to meet the Blackfoot and perhaps trade with them. With Henday winning the respect of the Blackfoot to such an extant that he was able to travel in their company  to within sight of the mighty Rocky Mountains and back another  in six days less than a year.

The following day, September 11, he crossed over from Saskatchewan into present-day Alberta. On October 11, he arrived at Waskesew River, perhaps the Red Deer River. Waskesew is an anglicization of the Cree word for elk. In Cree the Red Deer River is called .

Henday may not have been aware that the Blackfoot and the Cree were enemies. There is some indication in Henday's journal entries that the Cree were becoming wary of the tribes they and Henday were encountering. While the group was travelling in what Henday refers to as the "Muscuty plains," they came across a man named Attickasish with two Archithinue (Blackfoot). He said these people had never been in contact with any Europeans and his Cree companions were afraid of them. Then on October 14, Archithinue on horseback approached and asked if they were friend or foe.

That evening Henday stopped, near present-day Innisfail, at a massive Blackfoot encampment, which by Henday's count numbered 322 tepees. The 322-teepee encampment is said to have been located a few miles west of Pine Lake. (A cairn in Henday's honour was erected there later.) There, in the tent of the great chief of the Archithinue, he smoked a peace pipe and, through an interpreter imparted the purpose of his mission. Henday offered to have some of the Archithinues go with them back to York Factory. The Archithinue leader did not assent and explained that his people could not paddle and that York Factory was too far away. The leader of the Archithinue, probably, knew that his people would be travelling uninvited in Cree territory and would risk being killed by the Cree and other enemies. Henday urged the tribesman to build up their stocks of fur by going into the woods to hunt, and trap, but the tribesmen instead preferred to take their ease, staying in camp. "Enjoying their primitive entertainment of drumming and conjuring." After receiving an indefinite answer from the Blackfoot (which Henday took as a "no"), Henday returned to York Factory with news he had explored the area and met with the Blackfoot. Since the answer had been unsure, there were no more expeditions to what would eventually be Alberta until Peter Fidler in 1792.

In spring 1755 he set off to return to York Factory by going north to the North Saskatchewan River from which to proceed downriver and eastward. On March 3, 1755, he reaching the North Saskatchewan at the mouth of the Sturgeon River near present-day Fort Saskatchewan. “Here he camped while canoes were made and more fur-laden Indians arrived. When the ice left the river, a brigade of 70 canoes started downstream-but Hendy's woes were not over. At the French forts of La Corne and Paskoya, gifts of brandy from residents there persuaded the Indians to trade most of their prime furs, and they were lost to Henday's company” He celebrated St. George's Day (April 23) at the junction of Red Deer River and Trail Creek possibly, before arriving at the river. He set off downriver on April 27. The place of embarkation is unknown it may or may not have been upriver of present-day Edmonton. He arrived at Fort Paskoya "Pasqua" or "Paskoway Yay" on May 26 and York Fort on June 23.

As Henday travelled inland to the Blackfoot country and back to York Factory, he talked about the First Nations having problems with alcohol. He mentions on one day that his whole company was unable to travel because everyone was drinking. On 30 May 1755 Henday remarked in his journal that he is unable to continue their travels back to York Factory because "the [First Nations] drank too much" but they were using their best furs to trade with the French for the alcohol.

This trip, and later ones, took Henday across much of the prairies of what is now Saskatchewan and Alberta.

There is great uncertainty of his route his original journal of his trip and any notes in his own hand cannot be found. His journal was copied in four different and contradictory versions. His trip as presented in the journals cannot always be put in a modern context, due to there being no landmarks he identified that are still extant today.

He does record sighting what is thought to be the Rockies, which the natives he met called "Arsinie Watchie." "Had a fine view of Arsinie Watchie att a farr distance, it being the last sight that I ever shall have of it this year." (Henday's Journal, 1754, Dec. 24, 1754). But the native term and Henday himself could have been referring to a series of high hills, not in fact to the majestic mountains.

The puzzle is further deepened by the fact that a later version of his journal states (Oct. 29, 1754): "I had a fine prospect of Muscuty or Arsinee Warchee Country, and seed the Archithinues smoak; this will be the time I shall see that delightful country this trip inland."

But it is evident that he brought much trade to York Factory.

Henday left the service of the HBC in 1762 largely because his efforts for the company, at least in his estimation, had not been properly recognized.

Legacy
Historians commenting on Henday's brave journey write that “there is no feat in all the story of Northwestern travel that surpasses this.”, and that “His trip led to further development of the West. for it gave his company a new outlook.”

Anthony Henday Drive, a large ring road in Edmonton, is named in his honour, as is Henday Hall, one of the residence towers in the main student residence complex at the University of Alberta in that city.

See also
Ardley coalfield

References 

English explorers of North America
Explorers of Canada
People from the Isle of Wight
Hudson's Bay Company people
Pre-Confederation Alberta people
Pre-Confederation Saskatchewan people
Persons of National Historic Significance (Canada)